The Indochinese green magpie (Cissa hypoleuca) or yellow-breasted magpie, is a passerine bird of the crow family, Corvidae. It is native to mainland southeast Asia (Indochina) and adjacent China.

This species' yellow undersides make it distinct from the other species in its genus. 

They have russet coloured wings, with green shoulders, back, head and tail. They also have a thick black band marking from the bill, all the way round the head. The beak, legs and eye rings of this species are a vivid red, while their eyes are a very dark brown.

As with all magpies in the Cissa genus, their green plumage comes from the pigment lutein, which will fade to blue if the bird has an insufficient diet, and supposedly if exposed to bright or direct sunlight for too long (due to the fragility of the pigment)

References

Indochinese green magpie
Birds of South China
Birds of Indochina
Birds of Hainan
Birds of Cambodia
Birds of Laos
Birds of Vietnam
Indochinese green magpie